is one of syllable in Javanese script that represent the sound /ɡɔ/, /ɡa/. It is transliterated to Latin as "ga", and sometimes in Indonesian orthography as "go".

Pasangan 
Its pasangan form , is located on the bottom side of the previous syllable. For example,  - anak gajah (little elephant).

Extended form 
The letter ꦒ has a murda form, which is ꦓ.

Using cecak telu, the syllable represents /ɣ/.

Glyphs

Unicode block 

Javanese script was added to the Unicode Standard in October, 2009 with the release of version 5.2.

See also
 Ga (Indic)

References 

Javanese script